Monodonta viridis is a species of sea snail, a marine gastropod mollusk in the family Trochidae, the top snails.

Description
The shell is almost similar to Monodonta australis, but is dark green, unicolored or nearly so.

References

 [ Akihiko Matsukuma; Index to mollusks in Tableau Encyclopédique et Méthodique, part 23, pls. 391-488 by J. B. P. A. Lamarck; Conchologia ingrata  no. 6 (2012)]

External links
 To Encyclopedia of Life
 To World Register of Marine Species

viridis
Gastropods described in 1816